This uniform polyhedron compound is a symmetric arrangement of 12 tetrahedra, considered as antiprisms. It can be constructed by superimposing six identical copies of the stella octangula, and then rotating them in pairs about the three axes that pass through the centres of two opposite cubic faces. Each stella octangula is rotated by an equal (and opposite, within a pair) angle θ. Equivalently, a stella octangula may be inscribed within each cube in the compound of six cubes with rotational freedom, which has the same vertices as this compound. 

When θ = 0, all six stella octangula coincide. When θ is 45 degrees, the stella octangula coincide in pairs yielding (two superimposed copies of) the compound of six tetrahedra.

Gallery

References 
.

Polyhedral compounds